The Telugu Ganga project is a joint water supply scheme implemented in 1980s by the then Andhra Pradesh chief minister N.T.Ramarao and Tamilnadu Chief minister M. G. Ramachandran to provide drinking water to Chennai city in Tamil Nadu. It is also known as the Krishna Water Supply Project, since the source of the water is the Krishna river in erstwhile Andhra Pradesh. The main checkpoints en route include the Somasila reservoir in Penna River valley, the Kandaleru reservoir, the 'Zero Point' near Uthukkottai where the water enters Tamil Nadu territory and finally, the Poondi reservoir, also known as Satyamurthy Sagar. From Poondi, water is distributed through a system of link-canals to other storage reservoirs located at Red Hills, Sholavaram and Chembarambakkam.

The project was approved in 1977 after an agreement was reached between Tamil Nadu and the riparian states of Krishna river: Andhra Pradesh, Maharashtra and Karnataka.

In 2002, the religious leader Sathya Sai Baba announced a scheme of restoration and lining of the canal; a private undertaking. With an extensive rebuilding of the canal and several reservoirs, the project was completed in 2004, when Poondi reservoir received Krishna water for the first time.
After the re-lining and reconstruction, the Kandaleru-Poondi part of the canal was renamed Sai Ganga.

Jerdon's Courser
The area has however continued to be threatened by illegal construction work and activity related to a project proposed to link the rivers of India.

Notes

References

Geography of Chennai
Interbasin transfer
Water supply infrastructure in India
Canals in Tamil Nadu
Year of establishment missing